Harmony is a village and census-designated place in Providence County, Rhode Island, in the town of Glocester, located on U.S. Route 44 (Putnam Pike). As of the 2010 census, it had a population of 985.

Local sites and history
The historic 1816 Harmony Chapel and Cemetery are located at the center of the village. Several restaurants, the Harmony Library and golf courses are located nearby. In the early nineteenth century a toll booth of the Glocester Turnpike was located in Harmony to raise funds to maintain the road until it was abolished in the 1850s.

Geography
According to the U.S. Census Bureau, Harmony has a total area of 2.97 mi2 (7.68 km2), of which 2.94 mi2 (7.62 km2) is land and 0.023 mi2 (0.060 km2), or 0.78%, is water.

Demographics

Images

References

External links
Harmony Library
Harmony Fire Department
Glocester Heritage Society
Friends of Harmony Village

Villages in Providence County, Rhode Island
Census-designated places in Providence County, Rhode Island
Glocester, Rhode Island
Providence metropolitan area
Villages in Rhode Island
Census-designated places in Rhode Island